4118 Sveta, or by provisional designation, is an Eoan asteroid from the outer regions of the asteroid belt, approximately  in diameter. It was discovered on 15 October 1982, by Russian astronomer Lyudmila Zhuravleva at the Crimean Astrophysical Observatory in Nauchnij, on the Crimean peninsula. The asteroid was named after Soviet cosmonaut Svetlana Savitskaya.

Orbit and classification 
Sveta is a member the Eos family, the largest asteroid family of the outer main belt consisting of nearly 10,000 asteroids. It orbits the Sun at a distance of 2.7–3.3 AU once every 5 years and 3 months (1,916 days; semi-major axis of 3.02 AU). Its orbit has an eccentricity of 0.11 and an inclination of 9° with respect to the ecliptic.

Physical characteristics 

No spectral type has been determined for Sveta. Members of the Eos family are typically K-type asteroids.

Diameter and albedo 

According to the survey carried out by the NEOWISE mission of NASA's Wide-field Infrared Survey Explorer, Sveta measures 13.232 kilometers in diameter and its surface has an albedo of 0.192.

Rotation period 

As of 2018, no rotational lightcurve of Sveta has been obtained from photometric observations. The body's rotation period, pole and shape remain unknown.

Naming 

This minor planet was named after Soviet cosmonaut Svetlana Savitskaya (born 1948) who, in 1982, became the second woman after Valentina Tereshkova to fly in space, and in 1984 became the first woman to walk in space. Savitskaya has also been a champion of the 1970-FAI World Aerobatic Championships, a competition in sport aviation. The official naming citation was published by the Minor Planet Center on 1 September 1993. The asteroid 4303 Savitskij was named after her father Yevgeniy Savitskiy (1910–1990), a Hero of the Soviet Union and himself an aviator and fighter ace during the second World War.

References

External links 
 Asteroid Lightcurve Database (LCDB), query form (info )
 Dictionary of Minor Planet Names, Google books
 Asteroids and comets rotation curves, CdR – Observatoire de Genève, Raoul Behrend
 Discovery Circumstances: Numbered Minor Planets (1)-(5000) – Minor Planet Center
 
 

004118
Discoveries by Lyudmila Zhuravleva
Named minor planets
19821015
Svetlana Savitskaya